Gambit is a 1966 American comedy heist film starring Shirley MacLaine and Michael Caine as two criminals involved in an elaborate plot centered on a priceless antiquity owned by millionaire Mr. Shahbandar, played by Herbert Lom. It was nominated for three Academy Awards.

The film was advertised with the tagline, "Go Ahead: Tell the End (It's Too Hilarious to Keep Secret) But Please Don't Tell the Beginning!"

Gambit was directed by Ronald Neame from a screenplay by Jack Davies and Alvin Sargent from the original story of Sidney Carroll.

A remake was released in 2012, with a script by Joel and Ethan Coen.

Plot
Cockney cat burglar Harry Tristan Dean and his sculptor friend Emile Fournier discover exotic Eurasian showgirl Nicole Chang in a crowded Hong Kong nightclub. She bears an incredible resemblance both to the late wife of the world's richest man, an Arab named Ahmad Shahbandar, as well as to a priceless ancient Chinese statuette that he owns; Harry and Emile want to use her in a scheme to rob Shahbandar of it. Harry's mere explanation to Emile of the caper—in which Nicole meekly obeys instructions without even a single expression—is flawless.

Harry, Nicole (who initially resisted the offer), and Emile arrive in the Middle Eastern city of Dammuz; the former two assume the identities of Sir Harold Dean and Lady Nicole Dean and check into Shahbandar's hotel where Shahbandar himself lives in the penthouse. Harry's plot does not at all follow his imagined scenario; Shahbandar himself discovers Harry's deceitfulness, and only plays along with Harry and Nicole to see what they are plotting. She is aghast when she learns what Harry wants to steal, but goes along because she is falling in love with him.

Shahbandar invites them to dinner; Harry refuses but persuades Nicole to accept, so she will occupy Shahbandar while he will steal the statuette. Nicole, however, realizes that Shahbandar suspects them, and slips away to warn Harry. Working together, they steal the statuette without triggering the alarm; but a misplaced impulse afterwards causes Nicole to accidentally trigger the alarm anyway. At Harry's insistence, Nicole flees to the airport to return separately to Hong Kong, while he hides from the guards; he watches as they also check a secret compartment in the wall of the room, where the real statuette is hidden: the one in Harry's hands is a copy.

Shahbandar then rechecks the secret compartment, finds the fake, and has Nicole arrested at the airport. At breakfast, he tells her that his agents have found Harry in Hong Kong; he too will be arrested unless the real statuette is returned. She is free to go with a dossier of Harry if she takes that message to him.

At Emile's workshop in Hong Kong, Harry reveals that he actually hid the statuette inside a Buddha statue Emile had sold Shahbandar, and left the hotel a telegraph of this while she was traveling. In the least, Harry only wanted to give the appearance that it had been stolen, as no one yet knows when Shahbandar will reverse that credibility. Emile, in fact, made an exact replica of the statuette as well as the decoy that Shahbandar had on display; and with three prospective buyers already waiting, Harry and Emile must now sell the replica as the real thing.

Nicole proves unhappy at Harry's criminal lifestyle, so Harry smashes the replica to prove she is more important to him than his life of crime. She and Harry leave Emile supposedly disconsolate—until he receives a telephone call afterwards, happily starts making arrangements with a buyer, and takes one of several more replicas of the statuette.

Cast
 Shirley MacLaine as Nicole
 Michael Caine as Harry
 Herbert Lom as Shahbandar
 Roger C. Carmel as Ram
 Arnold Moss as Abdul
 John Abbott as Emile
 Richard Angarola as Colonel Salim
 Maurice Marsac as Hotel Clerk

Awards
Nominated for Academy Awards were:
 Alexander Golitzen and George C. Webb (Art Direction), John McCarthy Jr. and John P. Austin (Set Decoration), for Best Art Direction 
 Jean Louis for Best Costume Design
 Waldon O. Watson for Best Sound

Remake
In 2012, a new Gambit was released. This version co-starred Colin Firth and Cameron Diaz in the leads, with Diaz's character now a Texas rodeo performer who is coaxed by Firth into coming to England and attempting to con a billionaire played by Alan Rickman. The script for this adaptation was written by Joel and Ethan Coen.

See also
List of American films of 1966
Nonlinear narrative

References

External links

1966 films
1960s crime comedy films
American crime comedy films
American heist films
Films scored by Maurice Jarre
Films directed by Ronald Neame
Films set in Asia
Films set in Hong Kong
Films set in the Middle East
Universal Pictures films
1960s heist films
1966 comedy films
1960s English-language films
1960s American films
English-language crime comedy films